The gens Abronia was a Roman family during the time of the emperor Augustus. The gens is known primarily by two persons, the poet Abronius Silo, and his son, who wrote for pantomimes.

See also
 List of Roman gentes

References

Roman gentes